Baizai is an area of Upper Mohmand Tehsil, Mohmand Agency in the Federally Administered Tribal Areas of Pakistan. The area's local population consists entirely of Pashtuns, with many residents belonging to the Bazai sub-tribe of the larger Pashtun Mohmand tribe. In November 2011, the area came under media headlines when US-led NATO forces attacked a Pakistani military checkpoint in the town of Salala located in Baizai, killing 26 soldiers.

References

Populated places in Mohmand District